Old School Dropouts is the eighth studio album by the American pop/rock band The Connells, released in October 2001. It was produced and released by the band themselves on their Black Park Records label after parting ways with TVT. It was the last record that the band released officially  until 2021. The album was recorded in Raleigh, NC with the band recording in different ways, like using an analogue 4-track tape machine. After the departure of longtime drummer and founding member Peele Wimberley it features Jon Wurster on drums.

Track listing
All songs written by Mike Connell, except where noted.
"Bust" - 3:06
"Gladiator Heart" - 4:27
"Back in Blighty" - 4:05
"Radio" - 4:05
"Put Down" - 3:58
"Airlift" (George Huntley)- 3:04
"All the Time in the World" (Doug MacMillan) - 3:17
"Rusted Fields" - 4:41
"Hello Walter" - 3:35
"Washington" - 3:48
"The Bottom" (MacMillan) - 2:00

Personnel
The Connells
Mike Connell - guitar, vocals, mixing
David Connell - bass
Doug MacMillan - vocals
George Huntley - guitar, vocals
Steve Potak - keyboards, mixing, engineer
Jon Wurster - drums

References

The Connells albums
2001 albums
TVT Records albums